nProtect GameGuard (sometimes called GG) is an anti-cheating rootkit developed by INCA Internet. It is widely installed in many online games to block possibly malicious applications and prevent common methods of cheating. nProtect GameGuard provides B2B2C (Business to Business to Consumer) security services for online game companies and portal sites. The software is considered to be one of three software programs which "dominate the online game security market".

GameGuard uses rootkits to proactively prevent cheat software from running. GameGuard hides the game application process, monitors the entire memory range, terminates applications defined by the game vendor and INCA Internet to be cheats (QIP for example), blocks certain calls to Direct X functions and Windows APIs, keylogs keyboard input, and auto-updates itself to change as new possible threats surface.

Since GameGuard essentially works like a rootkit, players may experience unintended and potentially unwanted side effects. If set, GameGuard blocks any installation or activation of hardware and peripherals (e.g., a mouse) while the program is running. Since GameGuard monitors any changes in the computer's memory, it will cause performance issues when the protected game loads multiple or large resources all at once.

Additionally, some versions of GameGuard had an unpatched privilege escalation bug, allowing any program to issue commands as if they were running under an Administrator account.

GameGuard possesses a database on game hacks based on security references from more than 260 game clients. Some editions of GameGuard are now bundled with INCA Internet's Tachyon anti-virus/anti-spyware library, and others with nProtect Key Crypt, an anti-key-logger software that protects the keyboard input information.

List of online games using GameGuard 

GameGuard is used in many online games.

 9Dragons
 Atlantica Online
 Blackshot
 Blade & Soul
 Cabal Online
 City Racer
 Combat Arms: Reloaded
 Combat Arms: The Classic
 Darkeden
 Digimon Masters Online
 Dragon Saga
 Elsword (no longer used as of March 29, 2017)
 Flyff
 Grand Chase 
 Lineage 1 & 2
 Legend of Mir 3
 Seal Online
 Smash Legends
 Phantasy Star Online: Blue Burst
 Priston Tale
 Metin2
 Playpark Moxiang
 Pangya
 PUBG: Battlegrounds
 Mu Legend
 La Tale
 MapleStory
 PangYa
 Phantasy Star Online 2
 Riders of Icarus
 Rohan: Blood Feud
 RF Online
 Rumble Fighter
 Ran Online
 Rappelz
 Royal Crown
 Uncharted Waters Online
 Undecember
 Valkyrie Profiles Silmeria (PS2)
Fleet Mission: NavyField
Star Stable Online (removed at 16.6.2022)
Mir4 Global

References

External links 
 
 

Anti-cheat software

ja:NProtect#nProtect GameGuard